The Goethe-Institut (GI) is a non-profit German cultural association operational worldwide with 159 institutes, promoting the study of the German language abroad and encouraging international cultural exchange and relations. Around 246,000 people take part in these German courses per year.

The Goethe-Institut fosters knowledge about Germany by providing information on German culture, society and politics. This includes the exchange of films, music, theatre, and literature. Goethe cultural societies, reading rooms, and examination and language centres have played a role in the cultural and educational policies of Germany for more than 60 years.

It is named after German poet and statesman Johann Wolfgang von Goethe. The Goethe-Institut e.V. is autonomous and politically independent.

Partners of the institute and its centres are public and private cultural institutions, the German federal states, local authorities and the world of commerce. Much of the Goethe-Institut's overall budget consists of annual grants from the German Foreign Office and the German Press Office. The relationship with the Foreign Office is governed by general agreement. Self-generated income and contributions from sponsors and patrons, partners and friends broaden the scope of the work of the Goethe-Institut.

History
1951: The government of the German Federal republic replaced the Deutsche Akademie with the Goethe-Institut.
1952: The first Goethe-Institut opened in Athens.
1953: The first language courses run by the Goethe-Institut began in Bad Reichenhall. Due to growing demand, new centres of learning were opened in Murnau and Kochel, the focus of selection being on towns which were small and idyllic and which showed post-war Germany at its best. Lessons were taught from the first textbook developed by the Goethe-Institut, the now legendary "Schulz-Griesbach".
1953–55: The first foreign lectureships of what was the German Academy were taken on by the Goethe-Institut. Responsibilities include German tuition, teacher training and providing a programme of cultural events to accompany courses.
1959–60: On the initiative of the head of the arts sector of the Foreign Office, Dieter Sattler, the Goethe-Institut gradually took over all of the German cultural institutes abroad.
1968: Influenced by the student revolts of the late 1960s the Goethe-Institut readjusted its programme of cultural events to include socio-political topics and avant-garde art.
1970: Acting on behalf of the Foreign Office, Ralf Dahrendorf developed his "guiding principles for foreign cultural policy". Cultural work involving dialogue and partnership was declared the third pillar of German foreign policy. During the Willy Brandt era, the concept of "extended culture" formed the basis of activities at the Goethe-Institut.
1976: The Foreign Office and the Goethe-Institut signed a general agreement governing the status of the Goethe-Institut, henceforth an independent cultural organisation.
1980: A new plan regarding the location of institutes within Germany was drawn up. Places of instruction in small towns, mostly in Bavaria, were replaced by institutes in cities and university towns.
1989/90: The fall of the Berlin Wall marked a turning point for the Goethe-Institut. Its activities in the 1990s were centred on Eastern Europe. Numerous new institutes were set up as a result.
2001: The Goethe-Institut merged with Inter Nationes.
2004: The Goethe-Institut established the first Western information centre in Pyongyang, North Korea (closed in 2009). The Goethe-Institut Inter Nationes also reverted to its original and official name, Goethe-Institut (GI).
2005: The Goethe-Institut was honoured with the Prince-of-Asturias Prize of Spain.
2007: For the first time in more than ten years, the German parliament increased the funds of the Goethe-Institut.
2010: Bruno Bozzetto created a new Goethe-Institut film named "Va Bene".
2014: A Myanmar Goethe-Institut opens.

Organization
The Goethe-Institut is mainly financed by the national government of Germany, and has around 1,000 employees and an overall budget of approximately 366 million euros at its disposal, more than half of which is generated from language course tuition and examination fees. The Goethe-Institut offers scholarships, including tuition waiver, to students from foreign countries, who want to become teachers of German. One of the selection criteria for these scholarships is social or financial need.

Locations by country

 In Ghana, Togo and Cameroon, the Goethe-Institut opened its first African branches in 1961.
In Khartoum, Sudan, the Goethe-Institut first opened its doors in 1963 as  the fourth African branch. After this, a number of Sudanese college students showed interest in German scholarships and some later became part of the Sudanese community in Germany.
 In Bangladesh, the Goethe-Institut opened at Gladstone House, 80 Motijheel Commercial Area in Dhaka in 1961. The Goethe-Institut Dhaka was relocated to its present premises in Dhanmondi (House No. 23, Road No. 02) in 1967.
In Lebanon, the Goethe-Institut operates in Rue Gemmayze, one of Beirut's most renowned streets, facing the Collège du Sacré Cœur, with a remarkable number of students.
In Iran, the Goethe-Institut opened in Tehran in 1958, but was forced to close in 1981 in a diplomatic row between the host country and Germany. The institute continued some activities under the German embassy in Tehran as a "point for dialogue."
In Pakistan, the Goethe-Institut has two branches. The Goethe-Institut Karachi is located at Brunton Road, Civil Lines, near the Chief Minister's Residence. It is located in an old bungalow. The Lahore chapter of the Goethe-Institut is named "Annemarie Schimmel Haus", in honour of the well-known German Orientalist and scholar, who wrote extensively on Islam and Sufism. The Annemarie-Schimmel-Haus shares its premises with the Alliance française Lahore (AF), and together they organise joint cultural events.
The institutes in India are called Max Mueller Bhavans, in honour of the German philologist and Indologist Max Müller. They are situated in Chennai, Coimbatore, Pune, Mumbai, New Delhi, Kolkata, and Bangalore (Bengaluru).
In Indonesia, there are two Goethe-Instituts: in Jakarta and Bandung, and a Goethe-Zentrum in Surabaya.
In Vietnam, two branches of the institute are located in Hanoi, and in Ho Chi Minh City,.
In Kenya, there is a Goethe-Institut, also known as the German Cultural Centre, in the headquarters of the Maendeleo Ya Wanawake building. The Goethe-Institut is adjacent to the Alliance Française in Nairobi.
In the Philippines, a Goethe-Institut is currently located at Makati City where it was moved from its former location in Quezon City.

In the US, there are several Goethe-Instituts including the Goethe-Institut, New York and the Goethe-Institut Washington.
In Nigeria, there is a Goethe-Institut learning centre for those who are studying German at the University and those who want to learn the language. The centre is located on Lagos Island, Lagos. 
 In Great Britain the Goethe-Institut has a main presence in London's South Kensington area and other offices in Glasgow and in Kentish Town in North London.
 In Greece the Goethe-Insitut has branches in Athens and Thessaloniki.

Distance education
The Goethe-Institut offers distance education.

As a result of the COVID-19 pandemic, when most governments imposed stay-at-home orders and/or COVID-19 lockdowns, Goethe-Institut Singapur introduced a series of "Blended Learning" courses.

Examinations
The institute has developed a series of exams for learners of German as a foreign language (Deutsch als Fremdsprache, DaF) at all levels: A1 up to C2. These can be taken both in Germany and abroad and have been adapted to fit into the Common European Framework of Reference for Languages (CEFR), the standard for European language testing. There is also one exam, the Großes Deutsches Sprachdiplom, which is at a higher level than the highest CEFR level. Below is a table of the basic Goethe-Institut exams as they fit into the scheme:

In 2000, the Goethe-Institut helped to found the Society for Academic Test Development (Gesellschaft für Akademische Testentwicklung e.V.). The resulting TestDaF exams are run by the TestDaF-Institut in Hagen. The tests are supported by the German Academic Exchange Service (DAAD) and are aimed at people who would like to study at German universities, academics and scientists. The TestDaF can be taken in Germany as well as in 65 other countries.

In addition there is the Green Diploma to acquire and prove German as a foreign language teaching qualifications.

Awards and Residency programs
The two US-related annually granted awards for literature translations from German into English are: the renowned Helen and Kurt Wolff Translator's Prize, and the Gutekunst Prize of the Friends of Goethe New York which is open to college students and to all translators under the age of 35 who, at the time the prize is awarded, have not yet published.

Helen and Kurt Wolff Translator's Prize

Goethe Medal 

Once a year, the Goethe-Institut awards the Goethe Medal, an official decoration of the Federal Republic of Germany. It honours foreign personalities who have performed outstanding service for the German language and international cultural relations. The Goethe Medal was established by the executive committee of the Goethe-Institut in 1954 and acknowledged as an official decoration by the Federal Republic of Germany in 1975.

Goethe-Institut Award for New Translation 
The Society of Authors and the Goethe-Institut, London administer the biennial Goethe-Institut Award for New Translation.

Villa Kamogawa artist residency programme  
Goethe-Institut Villa Kamogawa (Japanese: ゲーテ・インスティトゥート・ヴィラ鴨川), is a German artist in residence institution in Kyoto, Japan. Established in 2011 with an opening ceremony conducted by Christian Wulff, President of Germany, it is located on the banks of the Kamo River in close vicinity to Kyoto Imperial Palace. Villa Kamogawa is the site one of the three major German arts residency programmes abroad, together with Rome's Villa Massimo and Villa Aurora in Los Angeles. It hosts three groups of four artists a year. Former fellows include Doris Dörrie, Jörg Koopmann and Stefan Goldmann.

Notable students 
 Avi Primor (born 1935), Israeli publicist and former diplomat
 Jorge Mario Bergoglio (born 1936), Pope Francis
 Ian Kershaw (born 1943), English historian
 Sanmao (1943–1991), Taiwanese author
 Renée Fleming (born 1959), American opera singer
 Auma Obama (born 1960), journalist

Recognition
In 2005, along with the Alliance française, the Società Dante Alighieri, the British Council, the Instituto Cervantes, and the Instituto Camões, the Goethe-Institut was awarded the Prince of Asturias Award for achievements in communications and the humanities.

In 2007, it received a special Konrad Duden Prize for its work in the field of German language.

See also 
 German American Partnership Program
 German Americans
 German Australian
 Hallo aus Berlin
 Cultural Diplomacy
 Public diplomacy
 British Council
European Union National Institutes for Culture

References

Further reading

External links 

 
 Yearbook App 2013 (in German)
 List of locations from the Goethe-Institut web site (in German and English)
 Learning German with the Goethe-Institut
 Learning German in Germany – German courses and exams – Goethe-Institut in Germany
 TestDaF website

 
Organizations established in 1951
Cultural promotion organizations
Foreign relations of Germany
Cultural organisations based in Germany
German-language education
International non-profit organizations
Johann Wolfgang von Goethe
Translation awards
1951 establishments in West Germany
Non-profit organisations based in Bavaria
Organisations based in Munich